Solute carrier family 22 member 2 (also termed OCT2 or organic cation transporter-2) is a protein that in humans is encoded by the SLC22A2 gene.

Polyspecific organic cation transporters in the liver, kidney, intestine, and other organs are critical for elimination of many endogenous small organic cations as well as a wide array of drugs and environmental toxins. This gene is one of three similar cation transporter genes located in a cluster on chromosome 6. The encoded protein contains twelve putative transmembrane domains and is a plasma integral membrane protein. It is found primarily in the kidney, where it may mediate the first step in cation reabsorption.

See also
 Solute carrier family

References

Further reading

Solute carrier family